El Fuerte Airport  is an airport located  at El Fuerte, Sinaloa, Mexico, a city located in the northern part of Sinaloa State. The airport is used solely for general aviation purposes.

External links
Cessna 172M taking off from MM79
MM79 at The Airport Guide.
MM79 at Elite Jets.
Baja Bush Pilots Forum about MM79

Airports in Sinaloa